Kinterbish Creek is a stream in the U.S. states of Alabama and Mississippi. It is a tributary to the Tombigbee River.

Kinterbish is a name derived from the Choctaw language purported to mean "beaver dam". Variant names are "Abeshai Creek", "Big Kinterbish Creek", "Kintabish Creek", "Kintabush Creek".

References

Rivers of Alabama
Rivers of Choctaw County, Alabama
Rivers of Sumter County, Alabama
Rivers of Mississippi
Rivers of Lauderdale County, Mississippi
Alabama placenames of Native American origin
Mississippi placenames of Native American origin